The Serbia women's national football team represents Serbia in international women's football competitions and is controlled by the Football Association of Serbia.

It was previously known as the Yugoslavia women's national football team from 15 January 1992 until 4 February 2003, and then as the Serbia and Montenegro women's national football team until 3 June 2006 when Serbia declared independence as the successor state to the State Union of Serbia and Montenegro. It was officially renamed the Serbia women's national football team on 28 June 2006, while the Montenegro women's national football team was created to represent the new state of Montenegro.

Both FIFA and UEFA consider the Serbia national team the direct descendant of the Serbia and Montenegro national team.

Between 1921 and 1992, this team did not exist as we know it today, since Serbia was part of the Kingdom of Yugoslavia (1918–1943) and later on, the Socialist Republic of Yugoslavia (1945–1991). The Serbia national team existed from 1919 to 1921, and then ceased to exist following the creation of the first Kingdom of Yugoslavia. The new national team formed in 1992 was considered the direct descendant of the Yugoslavia national team, as it kept Yugoslavia's former status, which was not the case for any other country resulting from the breakup of Yugoslavia.

History

After the dissolution of Serbia and Montenegro federation in 2006, the newly created women's team of Serbia played the first competitive match against Slovenia in May 2007, where they beat the hosts 5–0. For much of the late 2000s to 2010s, Serbia had been an insignificant name in the women's stage, only at best managed to finish in third, though the team did have some good results like an impressive 2–2 draw to powerhouse England in the UEFA Women's Euro 2013 qualifying or the 1–1 draw to Denmark in the 2015 FIFA Women's World Cup qualification.

During the 2023 FIFA Women's World Cup qualification, Serbia began with two defeats against European powerhouse Germany and rising force Portugal, leaving expectation as Serbia would again fail to qualify for a major tournament. However, Serbia began its resurgence with consecutive wins against Bulgaria, Israel and Turkey, before getting what would be the greatest achievement ever in their qualification campaign, beating European giant Germany 3–2 in the returning fixture, and thus increased hope for Serbia to qualify for the first ever major international tournament in the history.

Team image

Nicknames
The Serbia women's national football team has been known or nicknamed as the "Beli orlovi (The White Eagles)".

Rivalries

Like the men's counterparts, the women's team of Serbia also shares a rivalry with Croatia, albeit not at the scale of the men's sides. Neither sides have ever managed to debut at a major tournament, although Serbia has greatly improved at women's football in recent years, notably during the 2023 FIFA Women's World Cup qualification.

Results and fixtures

 The following is a list of match results in the last 12 months, as well as any future matches that have been scheduled.

Legend

2022

2023

Coaching staff

Current coaching staff

Manager history

Predrag Grozdanović (????–)

Players

Current squad
 Caps and goals accurate up to and including match against  on 21 February 2023.

Recent call ups
 The following players have been called up to a Serbia squad in the past 12 months.

Records

Active players in bold, statistics correct as of 2020.

Most capped players

Top goalscorers

Competitive record

FIFA Women's World Cup

*Denotes draws including knockout matches decided on penalty kicks.

See also

Sport in Serbia
Football in Serbia
Women's football in Serbia
Serbia women's national under-19 football team
Serbia women's national under-17 football team
Serbia men's national football team

References

External links
 Official website
 FIFA profile

 
European women's national association football teams
National team